Fort Road may refer to:

Fort Road, Edmonton, a road in Alberta, Canada
Minnesota State Highway 5, US, known as Fort Road
Fort Road Bridge, a bridge spanning the Mississippi River in Minnesota, US
Fort Road, Kannur, a road in Kerala, India
Fort Road, Lahore, a road in the Old Walled City of Lahore, Pakistan
 Fort Road Food Street, Lahore, Punjab, Pakistan

See also

 Fortified gateway, a road fort for controlling passage on a road
 "Fort in the Road", an episode of Amphibia
 
 Fort (disambiguation)
 Road (disambiguation)
 Fort Street (disambiguation)
 Fort Avenue (disambiguation)

Odonyms referring to a building